Ingela Brimberg (born in Stockholm) is a Swedish dramatic soprano opera singer.

Career 

Ingela Brimberg studied at the Academy of Music and Drama at the University of Göteborg. She then studied psychology at the University of Stockholm and in 1996 co-authored a paper on psychotherapy for alcohol dependent patients before being awarded a master's degree. Brimberg began her career as a mezzo-soprano, but has shifted to singing soprano roles. She was revealed to international audiences in 2011 in Bruxelles where she sang Valentine in the famous production of "Les Huguenots" directed by Olivier Py and conducted by Marc Minkowski; she won the Svenska Dagbladets Opera Award for this role in 2012.

Brimberg has an extensive repertoire of roles, from Mozart to Wagner, and including Beethoven, Puccini, Strauss, and Britten.  She has performed with leading orchestras, including the Swedish Radio Symphony Orchestra, Royal Stockholm Philharmonic Orchestra, Mozarteum Orchester Salzburg, Konzerthaus Orchestra Berlin, and the Verbier Festival Orchestra. She has performed at the Deutsche Oper Berlin, Teatro Real, Madrid, Theater an der Wien, Royal Swedish Opera, Stockholm, La Monnaie, Brussels, and Staatsoper Hamburg.

Recordings

Ingela Brimberg has made several opera recordings on CD, including Wagner's Der fliegende Holländer, Paris version, conducted by Marc Minkowski (Naive 2014), and Verbier Festival: Best of 2014 (Erato, 2015). She is featured on two DVD recordings, Wagner's Der fliegende Holländer (Harmonia Mundi, 2017), and Strauss's Elektra (C Major, 2015).

Personal life
Brimberg lives in Stockholm. She is married to Ulf Tengzelius and has two children.

References

External links
 Ingela Brimberg's website
 Ingela Brimberg on the Intermusica website

Living people
Swedish operatic sopranos
Swedish sopranos
Singers from Stockholm
Stockholm University alumni
1964 births